Elizabeth Bachinsky (born May 10, 1976) is a Canadian poet. She has published four collections since 2005: Curio, Home of Sudden Service, God of Missed Connections, and The Hottest Summer in Recorded History. Her second book, Home of Sudden Service, was nominated for a 2006 Governor General's Award for Poetry. Bachinsky's work has appeared in literary journals and anthologies in Canada, the U.S., France, Ireland, the U.K., China and Lebanon.

Personal life
Bachinsky was born on May 10, 1976, in Regina, Saskatchewan, and grew up in Prince George, British Columbia. She has an MFA in creative writing from the University of British Columbia. She lives in Vancouver, British Columbia, where she teaches creative writing at Douglas College. From 2006 to 2014, she was the editor of Event, a Vancouver literary journal.

Prizes and honours
2004: Nominee, Bronwen Wallace Memorial Award
2006: Nominee, Governor General's Award for English-language poetry (for Home of Sudden Service)
2009: Nominee, Kobzar Literary Award
2009: Nominee, Pat Lowther Award
2010: Shortlist, George Ryga Award for Social Awareness in Literature

Bibliography

Poetry
2005: Curio  BookThug
2006: Home of Sudden Service  Nightwood Editions
2009: God of Missed Connections  Nightwood Editions
2012: I Don't Feel So Good  BookThug
2013: The Hottest Summer in Recorded History  Nightwood Editions

Anthologies
2004: Pissing Ice: An Anthology of "New" Canadian Poets  BookThug
2005: In Fine Form: The Canadian Book of Form Poetry  Polestar
2008: Jailbreaks: 99 Canadian Sonnets  Biblioasis
2009: Fist of the Spider Woman: Tales of Fear and Queer Desire  Arsenal Pulp Press
2009: How the Light Gets In  University of New Waterford, Ireland
2009: Verse Map of Vancouver  Anvil Press

See also

Canadian literature
Canadian poetry
List of Canadian poets
List of Canadian writers

References

External links
Elizabeth Bachinsky
Records of Nightwood Editions are held by Simon Fraser University's Special Collections and Rare Books

1976 births
Living people
21st-century Canadian poets
21st-century Canadian women writers
Canadian women poets
People from Prince George, British Columbia
University of British Columbia alumni
Writers from Regina, Saskatchewan
Writers from Vancouver